This article is a list of work by De Es Schwertberger (born 1942), an Austrian artist, painter, and modeller.

De Es Schwertberger's works have been exhibited in the following one-person exhibits, group shows, and portfolios:

Galleries and exhibits

1960s

 Galerie Ernst Fuchs in Vienna, Austria (1963)
 Galerie Ernst Fuchs in Vienna, Austria (1965)

1970s

 Galerie Bernard in Solothurn, Switzerland (1970)
 Galerie Aurora in Geneva, Switzerland (1970)
 Galerie Hartmann in Munich, Germany (1970)
 Aktions Galerie in Bern, Switzerland (with H.R. Giger) (1971)
 Galerie Palette in Zürich, Switzerland (1971)
 Galerie Herzog in Büren, Switzerland (1971)
 Aktions Galerie in Bern, Switzerland (1972)
 Galeria La Lanterna in Trieste, Italy (1973)
 Künstlerhaus Galerie in Vienna, Austria (1974)
 Galerie Spektrum in Vienna, Austria (1974)
 Galerie Akademia in Salzburg, Austria (1974)
 Galerie Jasa in Munich, Germany (1974)
 Center on Art and Communication in Vienna, Austria (1974)
 Hansen Gallery in New York City, USA (1975)
 James Yu Gallery in New York City, USA (1976)
 Aldrich Museum in Connecticut, USA (1976)
 Graham Gallery in New York City, USA (1977)
 Gallery Yolonda in Chicago, USA (1978)
 Hansen Gallery in New York City, USA (1979)
 Quantum Gallery in New York City, USA (1979)

1980s

 Hansen Gallery in New York City, USA (1980)
 Virtu Gallery in Naples, Florida (1980)
 Bronx Museum in New York City, USA (1980)
 Art Expo in New York City, USA (1981)
 Marshall Fields Gallery in Chicago, USA (1981)
 Govinda Gallery in Washington, DC USA (1981)
 Art Expo in New York City, USA (1982)
 Graham Gallery in New York City, USA (New York Visionaries) (1982)
 Museum of the Visual Arts in New York City, USA (1983)
 Austrian Artists at the International Monetary Fund in Washington, DC, USA (1984)
 Studio Planet Earth in New York City, USA (1980-1986)
 Galerie Würthle in the Sinnreich, Austria (1987)
 Galerie Steinmühle near Linz, Austria (1988)
 Sammlung Ludwig Neue Galerie in Aachen, Germany (1988)

1990s

 Opel Fine Art in Vienna, Austria (1990)
 Gathering of Forty Planetarians in Bern, Switzerland (1991)
 Kreuzwegstation im Sinnreich, Austria (1993)
 The skin of the earth, at the Künstlerhaus Gallery in Vienna, Austria (1995)
  Exhibition in Frauenbad, Baden (1997)
 Sinnlicher Somme, Künstlerhaus Galerie in Vienna, Austria (1997)
 Wieder Sehen, Gallery Lang (1997)
 Kuenburg Payerbach, in Austria (1998)
 Retrospective, at the Chateau Gruyeres, Switzerland (1998)
 Centre for Documentation, St. Pölten (1999)
 Planetarians at the Vienna City Festival (1999)

2000s
 100 Planetarians at the Himmelswiese, Vienna (2000)
 Exhibition of Planetarians in Graz, Austria (2000-2001)
 Planetarians on vacation at Velden (2001)
 Exhibition of Planetarians in St. Peter an der Sperr, Wr. Neustadt (2001)
 Patterns of the city Gallery Akum in Vienna, Austria (2002)
 Gleichnis, Künstlerhaus, Vienna (2003)

Portfolios

Early work (the 1960s)
 Ideas of Truth, early 1960s. Based on the work of the Old Masters
 The Missing Weapon, 1968. Etchings
 Ideas of consciousness-expansion, 1960s and early 1970s.

Later development( the 1970s)
 Stone Period, 1970s.
 Work for Fundamental Images, early 1970s.
 Contemplations of the Spirit-Matter Mystery, late 1970s. Work revolves around his Stone Period style art

The 1980s
 The Cosmic Dance and the Light of Life, 1980s (completed 1989).
 Planetarians, mid-to-late 1980s.

The 1990s
 Planetarian Sculptures, 1990–1992. Exhibitions of 'Planetarian' sculptures.
 Humanity is One, Early to mid 1990s.

Books/publications

Books
 1972: Fundamentale Bilder (Fundamental Images)
 1982: Sharing Light
 1984: Philosophers Stone (a deck of 40 cards, for Sphinx Verlag)
 1992: Heavy Light (Published by Morpheus International)

Articles
 Omni Magazine
 Heavy Metal Magazine
 Triad Magazine
 Avant Garde Magazine
 Bres Magazine
 Arts Magazine
 L'Art Visionaire (Michel Random)
 The Viennese School of Fantastic Realism (Muschik)

See also
 De Es Schwertberger, the life of the artist
 Old Masters, on whose work he based his initial art
 Ernst Fuchs (artist), his tutor and early inspiration
 Fantastic Realism, school of art

References
 Schwertberger, De Es (1993) 1993 Heavy Light (The Art of De Es) Published by Morpheus International

External links/sources
 De Es' Website, shows his work and a chronology of his projects
 Dome of Peace, shows his work and future project (The 'Dome of Peace')

Schwertberger
Schwertberger